J Thomas & Co. Pvt. Ltd. is the largest and oldest existing tea auctioneers in the world, handling about 200 million kg of tea annually. The genesis of J Thomas was in Calcutta, the centre of tea trade in British India. The company is headquartered in Kolkata, West Bengal, India and has branches in Siliguri, Guwahati, Dibrugarh, Kochi, Coonoor, Coimbatore and Bengaluru.

The company is owned by its employees.

References

Employee-owned companies

External links
 
 Tea Catalogue - J Thomas & Co. Pvt. Ltd.
 Business Line, December - 2010
 The Telegraph, January - 2011
  The Economic Times, January - 2011
 The Telegraph, January - 2012
 The Hindu, January - 2012
 Business Line, April - 2013

Indian auction houses
Tea companies of India
Retail companies established in 1861
Companies based in Kolkata
Indian companies established in 1861